The Sziget Festival ("Sziget" for "Island") is one of the largest music and cultural festivals in Europe. It is held every August in northern Budapest, Hungary, on Óbudai-sziget ("Old Buda Island"), a leafy 108-hectare (266-acre) island on the Danube. More than 1,000 performances take place each year.

The week-long festival has grown from a relatively low-profile student event in 1993 to become one of the prominent European rock festivals, with about half of all visitors coming from outside Hungary, especially from Western Europe. It also has a dedicated "party train" service (with resident DJs) that transports festival-goers from all over Europe. The second event (1994), labelled Eurowoodstock, was headlined by performers from the original Woodstock festival. By 1997, total attendance surpassed the 250,000 mark, and by 2016 reached the 440,000 mark. In 2019 that record was once broken when 565,000 visitors attended the festival. Since the mid 2000s, Sziget Festival has been increasingly labelled as a European alternative to the Burning Man festival due to its unique features ("an electronically amplified, warped amusement park that has nothing to do with reality").

In 2011, Sziget was ranked one of the 5 best festivals in Europe by The Independent. The festival is a two-time winner at the European Festivals Awards in the category Best Major European Festival, in 2011 and 2014.

In 2002, Sziget branched out to Transylvania when its organisers co-created a new annual festival there titled Félsziget Fesztivál (Romanian: Festivalul Peninsula) that soon became the largest of its kind in Romania. In 2007, the organisers co-created Balaton Sound, an electronic music festival held on the southern bank of Lake Balaton that quickly gained popularity.

History 

Following the end of the Communist era in 1989, the formerly lively summer festival scene in Budapest faced a crisis due to a sudden loss of governmental funding. A group of artists and rock enthusiasts proposed the Sziget event as a way to bridge this gap. The festival was started in 1993, originally called Diáksziget (Student Island). This first event was organised by music fans in their spare time and ran well over budget, taking until 1997 to repay the losses. From 1996 to 2001 it was sponsored by Pepsi and renamed Pepsi Sziget. It has been called Sziget Fesztivál ("island festival") since 2002.

A comprehensive survey was done and published on the risktaking behaviour and mood of Sziget visitors (2007) by the National Institute for Health Promotion (OEI). The survey revealed amongst others that the last sexual encounter of 9.4% of its participants was unprotected.

Sziget Festival is notable in that it contains acts from many different genres. 2006 saw, among others, a blues stage, a jazz tent, a world music stage, alongside the main stage with more typical popular rock acts.

The festival is popular with west Europeans. Around 50% of visitors come from outside Hungary, with the largest group coming from the Netherlands. Many also come from Belgium, the UK, Germany, Italy, France, Ireland and Romania.

Being located on an island, some festival goers have tried to enter by swimming across the Danube or by paddling across in inflatable rafts. The organisers very much discourage these attempts as it is dangerous due to the tricky nature of the fast-flowing Danube river.

2008 
In 2008, Sziget Festival lasted from 11 to 18 August. The festival, instead of 7+1 days as in 2007, was 5+2 days long, with a "zeroeth day" that featured one major gig (Iron Maiden) and a special "minus first day" called "Day of Hungarian Songs" that headlined a number of popular Hungarian rock bands (including LGT and Beatrice). As well as Iron Maiden, R.E.M., Mass Hysteria, Babyshambles, Sex Pistols, Jamiroquai, Anti-Flag, Flogging Molly, Alanis Morissette, The Killers, The Kooks, Kaiser Chiefs, The Cribs, Speak and many other were also confirmed, the day of their performance is available at the Sziget website. The length of the festival was reduced so that the residents living in the neighborhoods nearby would have less trouble because of the noise. The organizers plan to take further steps to reduce noise: the metal stage will be open until 11 pm only and noise filtering walls will be built near the noisiest stages.

2009
Sziget 2009 was 10–17 August 2009. The festival had a 5+2 day schedule again. The "zeroeth day" had a Rock Against Racism concert, featuring mostly Hungarian bands. The "minus first day" had one major gig again, this time the 20th anniversary concert of Hungarian rock band Tankcsapda.

The Lineup:

Main Stage

IAMX,
Nouvelle Vague,
Ska-P,
Snow Patrol,
Lily Allen,
Miss Platnum,
The Ting Tings,
Die Toten Hosen,
Bloc Party,
Fatboy Slim,
Haydamaky,
Jet,
Primal Scream,
Pendulum,
The Prodigy,
The Subways,
Editors,
Klaxons,
Manic Street Preachers,
Placebo,
Disco Ensemble,
Danko Jones,
Maxïmo Park,
The Offspring,
Faith No More

World Music Main Stage

So Kalmery,
Napra,
Oi Va Voi,
Calexico, 
08001,
Orquesta Buena Vista Social Club,
Figli Di Madre Ignota,
Zamballarana,
Amadou & Mariam
Speed Caravan,
Woven Hand & Muzsikás,
N&SK,
Khaled,
Vieux Farka Touré,
Tiken Jah Fakoly,
Brotherhood of Brass: Boban Marković Orkestar + Frank London's Klezmer Brass Allstars

A38-WAN2 Stage:

Blasted Mechanism,
De Staat,
La Troba Kung-Fú,
Matatu,
Miloopa,
Muchachito Bombo Infierno,
Squarepusher,
Tricky,
White Lies,
Babylon Circus

White Lies' performance of "The Power and the Glory" from Sziget Festival was later used as the music video for the song.

Rock Stage:

Backyard Babies,
Brujeria,
Deathstars,
Donots,
Expatriate,
Life of Agony,
Satyricon,
Turbonegro,
Turisas

Party Arena:

Armin van Buuren,
Birdy Nam Nam,
Coldcut,
Dillinja,
Eric Prydz,
Grooverider,
Jose Padilla,
Paul Oakenfold,
Pete Tong,
808 State

2011

Mainstage 
Prince, Thirty Seconds to Mars, The Prodigy, Pulp, Chemical Brothers, White Lies, Kasabian, Kaiser Chiefs, Manic Street Preachers, Dizzee Rascal, Interpol, Flogging Molly, Kate Nash, British Sea Power, Skunk Anansie, Gogol Bordello, La Roux, Rise Against, The National, Hadouken!, Good Charlotte, Batucada Sound Machine.

Worldmusic Stage 
AfroCubism, Rotfront, Ojos de Brujo, Gotan Project, Eliades Ochoa, Hurlements d’Leo, Debout Sur Le Zinc, Goran Bregovic Wedding & Funeral Band and Shtetl Super Stars.

Party Arena 
Crystal Castles, 2 Many DJ's, Empire of the Sun, Goose and Zombie Nation.

Europe Stage 
Söhne Mannheims, Verdena, Go Back to the Zoo and Triggerfinger.

A38/Wan2 Stage 
De Jeugd Van Tegenwoordig, Baskerville, DeWolff, Kees van Hondt, Selah Sue, Marina and the Diamonds, Bloody Beetroots, Death Crew 77 and Hurts.

Metal Mainstage 
Deftones, Lostprophets, Within Temptation, Sonata Arctica, Judas Priest and Motörhead.

2014

Mainstage 
Monday, August 11:
Ivan & The Parazol, Leningrad, The 1975, Tankcsapda, Blink-182

Tuesday, August 12: 
Anti-Flag, Ska-P, Queens of the Stone Age, Deadmau5

Wednesday, August 13: 
Jake Bugg, Imagine Dragons, Placebo, Skrillex

Thursday, August 14: 
Mary PopKids, Bastille, Lily Allen, Macklemore & Ryan Lewis

Friday, August 15: 
Die Fantastischen Vier, CeeLo Green, Manic Street Preachers, Korn

Saturday, August 16: 
Bombay Bicycle Club, Punnany Massif, Madness, The Prodigy

Sunday, August 17: 
Triggerfinger, The Kooks, Outkast, Calvin Harris

A38 Stage 
Tuesday, August 12: 
Brody Dalle, A Day to Remember, Casper, Jimmy Eat World, The Bloody Beetroots, Deniz Koyu, Thomas Gold, Sikztah

Wednesday, August 13: 
Girls in Hawaii, The Big Pink, Tom Odell, Miles Kane, Clean Bandit, R3hab, Madeon, Andro

Thursday, August 14: 
Michael Kiwanuka, Fink, Irie Maffia, Bonobo, Stromae, Kavinsky (Outrun Live), Axwell, Muzzaik

Friday, August 15: 
Palma Violets, Band of Skulls, Angel Haze, Kelis, Klaxons, Sandro Silva, Laidback Luke, Dave Martin

Saturday, August 16: 
Starlight Girls, The BossHoss, Jagwar Ma, Wild Beasts, Crystal Fighters, Quentin Mosimann, Fedde le Grand, Julia Carpenter

Sunday, August 17: 
INVSN, Mount Kimbie, NOFX, La Roux, Darkside, DJAIKOVSKI ft. TK Wonder & MC Wasp, Ian Autorun, Borgore, Black Sun Empire, Jade

Lawsuit

Dr. Tamas Derce, the mayor of Újpest, the 4th district of Budapest, has sued Sziget Festival, claiming that the event is so loud the locals cannot sleep at night. The mayor wants to force the organisers by court decision to cease every program between 6 pm and 10 am - which virtually means closing down the festival. The mayor already lost a similar case against Sziget at court in 2002.
The organizers of the 2008 festival promised local officials that the main stage will shut down at 11 pm and no music on that stage will be played after that. For this reason the Iron Maiden concert was taken from its original starting time of 9:30 pm to 9:00 pm.

Previous years

Other activities
In addition to music, the festival offers a plethora of other activities including cinema, dance, theatre, tattooing, Internet access, volleyball, tennis, football, indoor rowing, rock climbing, bungee jumping and a life-sized foosball.

The island is located in the city of Budapest allowing trips to the city centre during the day.

See also

List of historic rock festivals 
Woodstock
An "artistic reply" to this festival is "Magyar Sziget" (Hungarian Island) at Verőce (Hungary), focusing on Hungarian rather than international music. It is held every year in July.

Notes

References

External links

 Official website in 12 languages: English, French, German, Italian, Dutch, Ukrainian, Finnish, Slovakian, Romanian, Spanish, Portuguese and Hungarian
 Official website for the Netherlands
 Official website for Spain
 Official website for the U.K.
 Official website for Turkey
 Sziget Ticketing
 Sziget 2007 Foto Group
 Latest news on Sziget on Budapest Festivals - unofficial news site
 Sziget News - independent news site and fan community
 Budapest All in One Guide

Music festivals in Hungary
Culture in Budapest
Rock festivals in Hungary
Heavy metal festivals in Hungary
1993 establishments in Hungary
Festivals in Hungary
Tourist attractions in Budapest
Electronic music festivals in Hungary
Music festivals established in 1993
Events in Budapest
Summer events in Hungary